Albert V, Duke of Mecklenburg (1397 – 1 June /6 December 1423) was Duke of Mecklenburg from 1412 until his death.

Life
Albert V was the son of Albert III, Duke of Mecklenburg, and Agnes (II) of Brunswick-Lüneburg, daughter of Duke Magnus II, Duke of Brunswick-Lüneburg.  Albert III died in 1412 and, in accordance with an agreement with John IV, Agnes acted as guardian and regent for Albert V.  In 1415 or 1416 he started ruling for himself.  After John IV died in 1422, Albert V and John IV's widow acted as co-regents for her minor sons Henry IV and John V.

On 13 February 1419, Albert V and John IV together with the Council of the Hanseatic City of Rostock founded the University of Rostock as the first university in northern Germany and in the entire Baltic region.

Since 1413 Albert had been engaged to Cecilia, the second daughter of the Burgrave Frederick of Nuremberg, later Elector of Brandenburg.  However, Albert and Cecilia never married.  Instead, Albert married Cecilia's sister Margaret in 1423.  Frederick gave Albert the districts of Dömitz and Gorlosen as her dowry. However, Albert died shortly after he and Margaret were married.

External links 
 Genealogical table of the House of Mecklenburg

Dukes of Mecklenburg
House of Mecklenburg
1397 births
1423 deaths
15th-century German people
Sons of kings